Devika Sharma, 32, is an English teacher at the Manzanilla High School and also the union representative of the board.

She lives in the town of Sangre Chiquito, Sangre Grande.

Appointed Senator as of December 17, 2007, by the United National Congress.

References 
General
UNC names 6 senators at https://web.archive.org/web/20070329132909/http://www.unc.org.tt/

Members of the Senate (Trinidad and Tobago)
United National Congress politicians
Living people
21st-century Trinidad and Tobago women politicians
21st-century Trinidad and Tobago politicians
Year of birth missing (living people)